Cayuga County is a county in the U.S. state of New York. As of the 2020 census, the population was 76,248. Its county seat and largest city is Auburn. The county was named for the Cayuga people, one of the Native American tribes in the Iroquois Confederation.

Cayuga County comprises the Auburn, NY Micropolitan Statistical Area, which is also included in the Syracuse-Auburn, NY Combined Statistical Area.

History
When counties were established in the Province of New York in 1683, the present Cayuga County was part of Albany County. This was an enormous county, including the northern part of the present state of New York and all of the present state of Vermont and, in theory, extending westward to the Pacific Ocean. This county was reduced in size on July 3, 1766, by the creation of Cumberland County, and further on March 16, 1770, by the creation of Gloucester County, both containing territory now in Vermont.

On March 12, 1772, what was left of Albany County was split into three parts, one remaining under the name Albany County. One of the other pieces, Tryon County, contained the western portion (and thus, since no western boundary was specified, theoretically still extended west to the Pacific). The eastern boundary of Tryon County was approximately five miles west of the present city of Schenectady, and the county included the western part of the Adirondack Mountains and the area west of the West Branch of the Delaware River. The area then designated as Tryon County now includes 37 counties of New York State. The county was named for William Tryon, colonial governor of New York.
In the years prior to 1776, most of the Loyalists in Tryon County fled to Canada.

In 1784, following the peace treaty that ended the American Revolutionary War, the name of Tryon County was changed to Montgomery County in honor of the general, Richard Montgomery, who had captured several places in Canada and died attempting to capture the city of Quebec, replacing the name of the hated British governor.

In 1789, Montgomery County was reduced in size by the splitting off of Ontario County. The actual area split off from Montgomery County was much larger than the present county, also including the present Allegany, Cattaraugus, Chautauqua, Erie, Genesee, Livingston, Monroe, Niagara, Orleans, Steuben, Wyoming, Yates, and part of Schuyler and Wayne Counties.

Herkimer County was one of three counties split off from Montgomery County (the others being Otsego and Tioga Counties) in 1791.

Onondaga County was formed in 1794 by the splitting of Herkimer County.

Cayuga County was formed in 1799 by the splitting of Onondaga County. This county was, however, much larger than the present Cayuga County. It then included the present Seneca and Tompkins Counties.

In 1804, Seneca County was formed by the splitting of Cayuga County. Then in 1817, in turn, a portion of Seneca County was combined with a piece of the remainder of Cayuga County to form Tompkins County.

In the late 19th and early 20th century, this region attracted European immigrants who developed farms or took over existing ones, particularly from Italy and Poland.

Geography

Cayuga County is located in the west central part of the state, in the Finger Lakes region. Owasco Lake is in the center of the county, and Cayuga Lake forms part of the western boundary. Lake Ontario is on the northern border, and Skaneateles Lake and Cross Lake form part of the eastern border.  Cayuga County has more waterfront land than any other county in the state not adjacent to the Atlantic Ocean.

Adjacent counties
 Oswego County – northeast
 Onondaga County – east
 Cortland County – southeast
 Tompkins County – south
 Seneca County – west
 Wayne County – west
 Prince Edward County, Ontario – north

Major highways

   Interstate 90 (New York State Thruway)
  U.S. Route 20
  New York State Route 3
  New York State Route 5
  New York State Route 31
  New York State Route 34
  New York State Route 38
  New York State Route 90
  New York State Route 104

National protected area
 Montezuma National Wildlife Refuge (part)

Demographics

2020 Census

2000 Census 
As of the census of 2000, there were 81,963 people, 30,558 households, and 20,840 families residing in the county.  The population density was 118 people per square mile (46/km2).  There were 35,477 housing units at an average density of 51 per square mile (20/km2).  The racial makeup of the county was 93.34% White, 3.99% Black or African American, 0.31% Native American, 0.42% Asian, 0.02% Pacific Islander, 0.88% from other races, and 1.03% from two or more races.  1.97% of the population were Hispanic or Latino of any race. 16.3% were of Irish, 16.0% English, 15.7% Italian, 11.3% German, 9.5% American and 6.3% Polish ancestry according to Census 2000. 94.9% spoke English, 2.0% Spanish and 1.0% Italian as their first language.

There were 30,558 households, out of which 32.60% had children under the age of 18 living with them, 52.00% were married couples living together, 11.00% had a female householder with no husband present, and 31.80% were non-families. 26.20% of all households were made up of individuals, and 11.90% had someone living alone who was 65 years of age or older.  The average household size was 2.53 and the average family size was 3.04.

In the county, the population was spread out, with 25.10% under the age of 18, 8.20% from 18 to 24, 29.70% from 25 to 44, 22.60% from 45 to 64, and 14.40% who were 65 years of age or older.  The median age was 37 years. For every 100 females there were 102.20 males.  For every 100 females age 18 and over, there were 101.80 males.

The median income for a household in the county was $37,487, and the median income for a family was $44,973. Males had a median income of $33,356 versus $23,919 for females. The per capita income for the county was $18,003.  About 7.80% of families and 11.10% of the population were below the poverty line, including 14.90% of those under age 18 and 8.20% of those age 65 or over.

At 2.3%, Cayuga County has the highest share of Ukrainian Americans of any county in New York State. The Ukrainian-American population in Cayuga County is heavily concentrated in the Auburn area.

Government and politics

|}

Cayuga County is considered a swing county in national elections. In 2000, Democrat Al Gore won Cayuga County with 50% of the vote to George W. Bush's 44%. In 2004, however, incumbent President Bush defeated John Kerry by a narrow margin of only 0.58%, or 49.22% to 48.64%. In 2008, it was won by Democrat Barack Obama, with 53% of the vote to Republican John McCain's 45%. In 2012, Obama won the county again by a slightly larger margin over Republican Mitt Romney.

However, like most of upstate New York, Cayuga County swung right in 2016. Republican Donald Trump carried it with 52.41% of the vote to Hillary Clinton's 40.76%, the largest Republican vote share since 1988 and the largest margin of victory for a Republican since 1984. In 2020, Trump carried the county again, this time taking 53.49% of the vote (the largest vote share for any Republican since 1984) to Joe Biden's 44.27%. Biden became the first Democrat to win the presidency without carrying Cayuga County since Jimmy Carter in 1976.

In statewide elections it has gone for Democrats: both Eliot Spitzer and Hillary Clinton won it in 2006 with more than 60% of the vote. In 2010, Democrat Andrew Cuomo defeated Republican Carl Paladino 53% to 40% for the governorship, with 3% going to Green Party candidate Howie Hawkins. Also in 2010, both Democratic U.S. Senators, Kirsten Gillibrand and Chuck Schumer, carried Cayuga County. Gillibrand won 54% of the vote, while Schumer won 61%.

The Cayuga County Legislature consists of 15 members, each of whom are elected from single-member districts.

Communities

Larger Settlements

† - County Seat

Towns

 Aurelius
 Brutus
 Cato
 Conquest
 Fleming
 Genoa
 Ira
 Ledyard
 Locke
 Mentz
 Montezuma
 Moravia
 Niles
 Owasco
 Scipio
 Sempronius
 Sennett
 Springport
 Sterling
 Summerhill
 Throop
 Venice
 Victory

Hamlets
 Kelloggsville
 Sherwood
 Westbury

Notable people 

 Charles Bogardus (1841–1929), politician and businessman
 William H. Carpenter (1821–1885), United States Consul to Foochow during the American Civil War
 Adam Helmer, (c. 1754–1830), American Revolutionary War hero
 William H. Seward (1801–1872), United States Secretary of State and Governor of New York
 Harriet Tubman (1822–1913), abolitionist and social activist
 Harold Wethey (1902–1984), art historian and professor of art history at the University of Michigan

See also

 Cayuga Community College
 Cayuga County Sheriff's Office
 List of counties in New York
 National Register of Historic Places listings in Cayuga County, New York
 USS Cayuga County (LST-529)

Notes

References

Further reading

External links

 
 Cayuga County NYGenWeb Project
 Cayuga County history pages
 Cayuga County Sheriff
 
 Cayuga Community College
 Cayuga County Historical Aerial Photographs of New York , Cornell University Library & Cornell Institute for Resource Information Sciences
 Genealogy and history resources for Cayuga County

 
1799 establishments in New York (state)
Populated places established in 1799
New York placenames of Native American origin